Alessandra Mirka Gatti or Alessandra Gatti born 19 November 1969 in Mantua, Italy is an Italian Eurobeat singer who is popularly known by her stage name of Domino.

Career 

Alessandra Mirka Gatti first got a name in Italo disco when she met Giancarlo Pasquini in the mid 1980s. After recording various tracks as a back vocalist, she recorded her first song under her most recognized alias, Domino, in 1989. She then helped found A-Beat C with Giacarlo Pasquini and Alberto Contini, in 1990, but left in 2006 to embark on her most recent project with executive producer, Sandro Oliva, Go Go's Music (Which had its first appearance on Super Eurobeat 175, and officially added to the label roster on Super Eurobeat 177.)

She has sung under these aliases with A-Beat C, not limited to the following: 
Domino
Mirka
Juliet
Groove Twins
King & Queen
Salt & Pepper
Paula Roberts
Sheela
Lucrezia B.
Donna Luna
Bella Model

Today she sings exclusively under the alias Domino, and as a member of the Eurobeat group Go Go Girls with Elena Gobbi Frattini – for her label Go Go's Music.

Her most well known songs are:

 "Tora Tora Tora" – Domino's most well known song, which was produced by Bratt Sinclaire for A-Beat C in 1994.
 "Mickey Mouse March (Eurobeat Mix) – A Eurobeat cover of the famous Disney tune, which has appeared on Dance Dance Revolution and many Eurobeat and Japanese Disney albums, including Eurobeat Disney.
 "Para Girl" – A Go Go's Music production that has been very popular since its release in August 2008.

Japan 
Thanks to her song Mickey Mouse March (Eurobeat Version), which aired on SMAPxSMAP and was danced by Takuya Kimura, Para Para rapidly increased in popularity in Japan in 1998. Some of her songs were featured in the Konami Video game Para Para Paradise.

Personal life 
Gatti was married to Italo disco/Eurobeat artist Giancarlo Pasquini and has a son named Federico, who was born to him. He has been raised by Gatti after their divorce, involved in music activity, and also active as a eurobeat singer the same as his parents under the stage name Kaioh (Formerly known as Freddy Rodgers).

Discography

As Domino

1990s

2000s

2010s

2020s

Featured songs

As Mirka

As Juliet

As Sheela

See also 

A-Beat-C
Eurobeat
Italo disco
Para Para

References

External links 

DOMINOnline.net – Domino's Official Website. (Previously a fan-website)
EurobeatPRIME – Eurobeat info/database.
Interview with Domino – The World of Italo disco Interviews

English-language singers from Italy
Italian women singers
Eurobeat musicians
Living people
1969 births
Avex Group artists